The Cathedral (1898) is a novel by the French writer Joris-Karl Huysmans. A revised English edition was published in 2011.

It is the third of Huysmans' books to feature the character Durtal, a thinly disguised portrait of the author. He had already featured the character of Durtal in Là-bas and En route, which recounted his conversion to Catholicism.

The Cathedral continues the story. After his retreat at a Trappist monastery, Durtal moves to the city of Chartres, renowned for its cathedral. Huysmans describes the building in great detail.

Publishing history
Huysmans first published fourteen extracts from La cathédrale as a serial in the newspaper L'Écho de Paris, beginning on October 27, 1897. The entire novel was published as a book in January 1898. Some commentators questioned the sincerity of the author's religious beliefs, but the novel was the most commercially successful of Huysmans' works during his lifetime. He retired from his job as a civil servant and lived on his royalties.

Reception
The novel was popular and sold the most of any of his works. It was translated into English. Due to its extensive details about the cathedral, tourists often used it as a guidebook. In 2011, a revised edition was published in English.

Sources
 Robert Baldick, The Life of J.-K. Huysmans (OUP, 1955; revised edition by Brendan King, Dedalus, 2006)
 The Cathedral translated by Clara Bell (1898)

Further reading
 Bałus, Wojciech (2008). "La Cathédrale of Joris-Karl Huysmans and the Symbolical Interpretation of the Gothic Cathedral in the 19th Century," Artibus et Historiae, Vol. 29, No. 57, pp. 165–182.
 Courtney, W.L. (1904). "Huysmans' 'The Cathedral'." In: The Development of Maurice Maeterlinck and Other Sketches on Foreign Writers. London: Grant Richards, pp. 76–84.
 Raybould, A. (1929). "The Cathedral," The Catholic World, Vol. CXXVIII, pp. 443–448.
 Ziegler, Robert (2001–2002). "The Seasons of the Soul in J.-K. Huysmans’s La Cathédrale," Nineteenth-Century French Studies, Vol. 30. No. 1/2, pp. 148–160.

External links

 
 La Cathédrale available at www.huysmans.org 

1898 French novels
Cathedrals in fiction
Novels by Joris-Karl Huysmans
Novels first published in serial form
Novels set in France
Works originally published in L'Écho de Paris